Gaston Gaffney (25 March 1928 – 7 January 1976) was a South African weightlifter. He competed at the 1956 Summer Olympics and the 1960 Summer Olympics.

References

External links
 

1928 births
1976 deaths
South African male weightlifters
Olympic weightlifters of South Africa
Weightlifters at the 1956 Summer Olympics
Weightlifters at the 1960 Summer Olympics
Sportspeople from Cape Town